Dening is a surname. Notable people with the surname include:
Wesley Dening (born 1983), Australian television host and comedian
Mitch Dening (born 1988), Australian baseball player
Greg Dening (1931–2008), Australian historian
John Pitt Dening (1894–1929), British polo champion
Fernando Emanuel Dening (born 1988), Argentine footballer